Mahottari may refer to:

 Mahottari District, Nepal
 Mahottari Rural Municipality, Mahottari District, Nepal